George Goring may refer to:
George Goring (died 1594), MP for Lewes 1559 and 1563
George Goring (died 1602), MP for Lewes 1593 and 1601
George Goring, 1st Earl of Norwich (1585–1663), Royalist soldier
George Goring, Lord Goring (1608–1657), Royalist soldier & eldest son of the above
George Goring, Lord Goring, a character in Anthony Powell's 1952 novel A Buyer's Market